Zygaena haberhaueri  is a species of moth in the Zygaenidae family. It is found in Armenia and Georgia
In Seitz it is described With red collar, but without red belt. On forewing obliquely from costa to anal angle an evenly wide greyish black band separating a triangular marginal patch from the red area of the wing, this area moreover being costally incised at the basal third or divided by a slight band. In Armenia, apparently in localities where for a long while past no collections have been made.

References

External links
Lepiforum.de
Moths described in 1870
Zygaena